Buôn Đôn is a rural district of Đắk Lắk province in the Central Highlands region of Vietnam. As of 2003, the district had a population of 56,238. The district covers an area of 1,414 km². The district capital lies at Ea Wer.

Administrative divisions 
It contains one township, Buôn Đôn, and seven communes:
Cuôr Knia
Ea Bar
Ea Huar
Ea Nuôl
Ea Wer
Krông Na
Tân Hòa

References

Districts of Đắk Lắk province